"Hanginaround" is a song by American rock band Counting Crows. It is the first track on their third album, This Desert Life (1999). Released on October 18, 1999, the song reached number 28 on the US Billboard Hot 100, becoming their biggest hit on the chart from this album. It also reached number one on the Billboard Adult Alternative Songs chart, their second number-one single on this listing.

Outside the United States, "Hanginaround" became the band's fifth top-10 single in Canada, reaching number three on the RPM Top Singles chart, and peaked within the top 50 in Ireland, New Zealand, and the United Kingdom. In April 2022, American Songwriter ranked the song at number nine on their list of "The Top 10 Counting Crows Songs".

The chorus of the song was used as the main theme for the 2006 NBC sitcom Four Kings.

Background
As with on much of the This Desert Life album, Hanginaround saw the band experimenting with different recording techniques - in this case, utilizing looping. The song consists of eight different piano loops arranged in various configurations in setup inspired by Brian Wilson's Smile project. According to Counting Crows fansite anna-begins.com, Duritz says:

In an interview with Songfacts, Adam Duritz summed up his thought process behind the lyrics by stating "The idea of a song created with loops made me think of being on a loop myself. I wrote that song about when I was younger and the latter years in Berkeley and how I loved it there, but I was kind of going nowhere."

Music video
The music video for the song shows the band performing the song in a living room of a house surrounded by a large crowd, as well as Adam Duritz waiting at a bus stop on a clear, colorful day. Throughout the video, the scene changes constantly, from people walking by (including one woman naked with her exposed areas blurred) to a construction crew removing the bench and replacing it with a bus canopy they built, to the other band members performing with Adam. At the end, a woman walks up to the canopy and sits next to Adam. After he glances at her necklace, a bus pulls up. Many others board it first, and as the woman is about to do so, she asks Adam to ride with her. He agrees, and gets on. The video ends with the crowd in the living room applauding the performance, and the bus (with posters of the band's "This Desert Life" album cover on the back of it) driving away from the stop.

Track listings

US 7-inch single
A. "Hanginaround"
B. "A Long December"

UK CD single
 "Hanginaround" (CD version)
 "Baby, I'm a Big Star Now"
 "Omaha" (live)

European CD single
 "Hanginaround" – 4:12
 "Mercury" – 8:17
 "Goodnight Elisabeth" (live) – 6:44

Charts

Weekly charts

Year-end charts

Release history

References

1999 singles
1999 songs
Counting Crows songs
DGC Records singles
Geffen Records singles
Song recordings produced by Sebastian Arocha Morton
Songs written by Adam Duritz
Songs written by Charlie Gillingham
Songs written by Dan Vickrey
Songs written by David Bryson
Comedy television theme songs